Panevėžio Ekranas is a Lithuanian football club, from the city of Panevėžys. It won 7 top-tier champion and 5 national cup titles throughout its existence.

The club was founded in 1964 and for 44 years competed in the top tier of Lithuanian football. However, at the end of 2014 season the club ran into financial difficulties, failed to meet admission criteria to A Lyga for the 2015 season, and was subsequently declared bankrupt. A new club FK Panevėžys was formed to represent the city of Panevėžys, which managed to pass licensing criteria for the 2015 I Lyga season. FK Ekranas was declared bankrupt in 2016. In 2020 FK Ekranas was restored. It plays in the 2nd tier of Lithuania.

FK Ekranas won Lithuanian championships in 1985 (Soviet Lithuania), 1993, 2005, 2008, 2009, 2010, 2011 and 2012, the Lithuanian Cup in 1985 (Soviet Lithuania), 1998, 2000, 2010 and 2011 and the Lithuanian Super Cup in 1998, 2006, 2010, 2011 and 2012.

On 5 November 2004, before the A Lyga champion-deciding match against FBK Kaunas, the club was controversially expelled from the top division by the National Football Club Association (NFKA) for alleged match fixing, but reinstated a day later.

In August 2006 FK Ekranas won the first Baltic Champion's Cup tournament in Liepāja after beating Estonian champions TVMK Tallinn 6–4 and drawing with the home side Liepājas Metalurgs 1–1.

Honours

A Lyga
Winners (7): 1992–93, 2005, 2008, 2009, 2010, 2011, 2012
Runners-up (4): 1990, 2003, 2004, 2006
II Lyga
Winners (1): 2021
Lithuanian Cup
Winners (5): 1985, 1998, 2000, 2010, 2011
Runners-up (5): 1972, 1994, 2003, 2006, 2012
Lithuanian Super Cup
Winners (4): 1998, 2006, 2010, 2011
Runners-up (1): 2009
Lithuanian SSR Championship
Winners (1): 1985

Participation in Lithuanian Championships

UEFA club competition results
Updated 23 July 2013

*FC Artmedia Bratislava victory after the penalty shootout. 

 1Q – 1st Qualifying Round; 2Q – 2nd Qualifying Round; 1R – 1st Round; 2R – 2nd Round

Players

Famous players
FK Ekranas players famous internationally and legends from the club or Lithuania. Players whose name is listed in bold represented their countries while playing for Ekranas.

 Marius Stankevičius (1998–2001)
 Edgaras Česnauskis (2000–2003)
 Deividas Česnauskis (1997–2000)
 Saulius Mikoliūnas (2003)
 Arūnas Klimavičius (2000–2007)
 Ignas Dedura (2011–2013)
 Andrius Velička (2011–2012)

Notable players

 Vytautas Černiauskas
 Emilijus Zubas
 Vykintas Slivka
 Dainius Gleveckas
 Andrius Jokšas
 Vaidas Slavickas
 Irmantas Stumbrys
 Mantas Savėnas
 Edvinas Girdvainis
 Dušan Matović
 Marko Anđelković
 Dejan Đenić
 Aleksandar Susnjar
 Elivelto
 Vīts Rimkus
 Taavi Rähn
 Serghei Pogreban
 Stephen Ademolu
 Deimantas Bička
 Marius Skinderis
 Simas Skinderis
 Vaidotas Šlekys
 Dominykas Galkevicius
 Mantas Samusiovas
 Ramūnas Radavičius

Managerial history

References

Defunct football clubs in Lithuania
2014 disestablishments in Lithuania
Association football clubs disestablished in 2014
Ekranas Panevėžys
1964 establishments in Lithuania
Association football clubs established in 1964
Football clubs in Panevėžys